Vanessa D'Ambrosio (born 26 April 1988) is a former Captain Regent of San Marino, serving from April until October 2017 (alongside Mimma Zavoli).

Early life and education

She was born in Borgo Maggiore, San Marino on 26 April 1988. She graduated with a thesis on the economy of labor and the gender issue in Saudi Arabia after the Gulf crisis from the University of Bologna. She is the granddaughter of Francesco Berti, one of the founders of the Sammarinese Communist Party.

Career

She was elected to the Grand and General Council back in 2014. She was appointed to become a coordinator for the United Left. D'Ambrosio is the second youngest woman who becomes Captain Regent in the history of San Marino after Maria Lea Pedini-Angelini, who was sworn in at the age of 25. Since December 2016, D'Ambrosio is the Head of Delegation for San Marino to the Council of Europe. She participated in the Strasbourg Plenary Session in January 2017, where she signed a motion for the protection of migrant children through education.

References

External links
Vanessa D'Ambrosio Bio

1988 births
People from Borgo Maggiore
21st-century women politicians
Captains Regent of San Marino
Members of the Grand and General Council
Female heads of state
Living people
Sammarinese women in politics
University of Bologna alumni